Bijpur is a locality in Kanchrapara Municipality of North 24 Parganas district in the Indian state of West Bengal. It is a part of the area covered by Kolkata Metropolitan Development Authority (KMDA).

Geography

Location
It has an average elevation of 13 metres (43 feet).

96% of the population of Barrackpore subdivision (partly presented in the map alongside) live in urban areas. In 2011, it had a density of population of 10,967 per km2 The subdivision has 16 municipalities and 24 census towns.

For most of the cities/ towns information regarding density of population is available in the Infobox. Population data is not available for neighbourhoods. It is available for the entire municipal area and thereafter ward-wise.

All places marked on the map are linked in the full-screen map.

Police station
Bijpur police station under Barrackpore Police Commissionerate has jurisdiction over Kanchrapara and Halisahar Municipal areas.

Kolkata Urban Agglomeration
The following Municipalities, Census Towns and other locations in Barrackpore subdivision were part of Kolkata Urban Agglomeration in the 2011 census: Kanchrapara (M), Jetia (CT), Halisahar (M), Balibhara (CT), Naihati (M), Bhatpara (M), Kaugachhi (CT), Garshyamnagar (CT), Garulia (M), Ichhapur Defence Estate (CT), North Barrackpur (M), Barrackpur Cantonment (CB), Barrackpore (M), Jafarpur (CT), Ruiya (CT), Titagarh (M), Khardaha (M), Bandipur (CT), Panihati (M), Muragachha (CT) New Barrackpore (M), Chandpur (CT), Talbandha (CT), Patulia (CT), Kamarhati (M), Baranagar (M), South Dumdum (M), North Dumdum (M), Dum Dum (M), Noapara (CT), Babanpur (CT), Teghari (CT), Nanna (OG), Chakla (OG), Srotribati (OG) and Panpur (OG).

Economy
Bhushan Steel, which had signed an agreement with West Bengal government for setting up a 2 million tonne integrated steel and power plant at Salanpur in Bardhaman district, was to set up a cold rolled unit at Bijpur. Covering  of land this project was to have a capacity of five lakh tons. It was cleared by West Bengal government on 22 August 2007. In 2012, Bhusan Steel put the Salanpur project on hold because of non-availability of land and other problems.

Healthcare
North 24 Parganas district has been identified as one of the areas where ground water is affected by arsenic contamination. In Bijpur Kanchrapara, there are few Nursing Homes, Polyclinics and Hospitals include Kanchrapara's Shibani Hospital and Halisahar's Naanna Hospital.

References

Cities and towns in North 24 Parganas district
Neighbourhoods in North 24 Parganas district
Neighbourhoods in Kolkata
Kolkata Metropolitan Area